Kim Byung-se (born September 26, 1962) is a South Korean actor. Kim attended California State University Long Beach. Kim is an avid golfer and can be often seen golfing on his Instagram. Him and his wife have two dogs.

Filmography

Film

Television series

Awards and nominations

References

External links 
 
 
 
 

1962 births
Living people
South Korean male television actors
South Korean male film actors
Best New Actor Paeksang Arts Award (film) winners